Miraflores Charterhouse is an Isabelline style charterhouse, or Carthusian monastery of the Order of the Carthusians, built on a hill (known as Miraflores) about three kilometres from the center of the Spanish city of Burgos, autonomous community of Castile and León.

Its origin dates back to 1442, when King John II of Castile donated a hunting lodge outside Burgos, which had been erected by his father Henry III of Castile "the Mourner" in 1401, to the Order of the Carthusians for its conversion into a monastery, thus fulfilling his father's wishes, as stated in his will. A fire in 1452 caused the destruction of the pavilion, and construction of a new building began in 1454. It is this building, which was placed under the patronage of Saint Mary of the Annunciation, which exists today. The construction was commissioned to Juan de Colonia, and was continued after his death by his son, Simón de Colonia, who completed the structure in 1484 at the behest of Queen Isabella I of Castile, surviving daughter of king John II of Castile and queen Isabella of Portugal, whose impressive buried are housed in the monastery.

It is a late-Gothic jewel, and its highlights include the church, whose Isabelline style western facade is decorated with the coats-of-arms of its founders. The monastery consists of a single nave with stellar vault and side chapels, and is topped by a polygonal apse.

Situation and access 
The Charterhouse is 3 km east of the city center of Burgos, in the parque de Fuentes Blancas, close to the Arlanzón River.
The monument is easily accessible from the city of Burgos, and can be reached along an easy footpath in a natural setting. It is possible to go by bus or taxi from the city, and it has free parking for private vehicles and buses. Visits are free and open to the public.

Origins 
First in 1401 was erected the Palace-alcázar of Miraflores, built by King Henry III of Castile "the Mourner". Later, the Miraflores Charterhouse was founded in 1442 after the donation to Order of the Carthusians by King John II of Castile inside the Palace-alcázar of Miraflores. That original monastery, originally placed under the patronage of Saint Francis of Assisi, suffered a fire in 1452 causing a new approach to the building according to the current design, which was commissioned architect Juan de Colonia, who worked at that time in the Cathedral of Burgos.

With the arrival to the throne of the John II's daughter, Isabella I of Castile, return the work in monastery from the year 1477, undertaking new projects such as the Sepulchers of the Kings or the Altarpiece. It will continue the architectural tracery of Garci Fernández de Matienzo and later of Simón de Colonia, son of Juan de Colonia, finishing the works of vaulting of the monastery in year 1484.

Between 1532 and 1539 undertaken other architectural works in the monastery under direction of Diego de Mendieta, designed to create the side chapels and give greater height to the church as well as the incorporation of spires and pinnacles, and incorporation of the cresting.

19th-century drawings of the Miraflores Charterhouse
Both of these sights preverves within today

Written sources
The sources for the study of the Miraflores Charterhouse include writings of various kinds
 Compendium of the Libro becerro entitled Brief and compendious news of the foundation of this Miraflores Charterhouse taken from Libro Becerro with worthy of knowing's other news, and covering events and privileges granted to the Charterhouse from 1442-1764.
 Other sources, among which are the following contributions:
 Iglesia, Fr. Nicolás, "Flowers of Miraflores sacred hieroglyphics, figurative truths, true shadows of the Mistery of the Immaculate Conception of the Virgin and Mother of God Our Lady Mary […]», Burgos, 1659.
 Vallés, José de, "First Institute of the Sacred Religion of the Cartuxa: foundations of convents throughout Spain, martyrs of England and generals of the whole order" Madrid, 1663.
 Arias de Miranda, Juan, "Historical Notes about Miraflores Charterhouse Burgos» Burgos, 1843.
 Tarín and Juaneda, Francisco, "The Royal Miraflores Charterhouse (Burgos). History and description" Burgos, 1896.

Exterior set

Floor

The floor of the monastery follows other Carthusian monasteries's pattern of the Middle Ages. The floor develops from the placement of the church and the layout of two main cloisters for each of the groups of Carthusian monks who inhabit: Fathers and Brothers. Around these two cloisters are individual hermitages that allows the monk to live solitude and silence own of the Carthusian spirituality. This part of the monastery is not visitable.

The floor of the church is formed by a single quadripartite longitudinal nave, distinguishing the spaces of the chancel, the choir of the Fathers, the choir of the Brothers and the faithfuls stay. The nave is closed with vaults with tiercerons, keeping the Gothic original layout.

Portal

The church's portal rose in year 1486 and was originally located on left side of the monastery, providing access to faithfuls directly from outside the monastery. It consists of pointed archivolts decorated with plants, animals and some human figurative motifs located under a big ogee with poaceaes. In the tympanum represents the motive of the Compassion of the Virgin, which according to late-Medieval iconographic canons, shows the Virgin sitting with her died Son in her arms, accompanied by the symbols of the moon and sun.

Stylistically it is linked to the works of the Colonia (father and son), who participated in the rising of the monastery. It can also relate with other portals of other Burgalese monasteries, i.e. the church of San Nicolás de Bari or the church of San Lesmes Abad.

Between 1657 and 1659 was ordered its move to the current location, accessing from courtyard de la Portería and connecting to the nave of the monastery. In year 2010 proceeded to restore the portal to returning to its original condition, especially recovering the Compassion of the Virgin's sculpture.

Courtyard
The entrance's portal to the church of the Charterhouse is currently located in an entrance's courtyard landscaped with a Saint Bruno of Cologne's statue, founder of the Order. Its tracery dates from first half of the 16th century, originally serving as connection of the stays of the monastery with the service units and the portería.

The arcaded long gallery preceding the courtyard is formed by arches that form recessed groin vaults finished off in keystones with modular decoration. In 2010 the cloister is intervened for ensure the maintenance of the walls and consolidate the out of waters of the courtyard, that suffered inclement weather.

Inside set

Altarpiece
The main altarpiece of the Charterhouse was carved in wood by artist Gil de Siloé and polychrome and gilded by Diego de la Cruz (whose gold came from the first shipments of the Americas after its discovery) Made between 1496 and 1499, is undoubtedly one of the most important existing works of the Spanish Gothic sculpture, by its compositional and iconographic originality and excellent quality of carving, valued by the polychrome.

One of the most important elements of the altarpiece is the angelic wheel in which is framed  the Christ crucified image for its beauty and significantly accentuated expressiveness by the work of polychrome of Diego de la Cruz. In the outer part of the wheel, are placed the figures of God the Father to the left and the Holy Spirit to the right bearing the rungs of the cross.

In the bottom of the cross, the figures of the Virgin Mary and John the Evangelist complete the scene. The pelican located at top of the cross gives the core set an extraordinary symbolic value as an allegory to the Eucharistic sacrifice, because the bird feeds its birdies of its own blood.

Royal Sepulchers

The royal sepulchers set were designed by artist Gil de Siloé commissioned by Queen Isabella I of Castile. On the one hand is the Sepulchers of John II of Castile and Isabella of Portugal, placed in the nave's center, eight-pointed star shaped. And in the Gospel side of the church is located the Sepulcher of infante Alfonso of Castile. Both sepulchers were made in alabaster and are late-Gothic sculpture's jewels.

Sepulchers of the King John II of Castile and Queen consort Isabella of Portugal 
The sepulcher of John II of Castile and of his second wife Isabella of Portugal is made in alabaster and is in Gothic style. It has octagonal eight-pointed star shaped, formed by the superposition of a square and a diamond.

Gallery

References

External links 

 Cartuja de Miraflores

Roman Catholic churches in Burgos
Monasteries in Castile and León
Isabelline architecture
Historical Patrimony of Spain
Carthusian monasteries in Spain
Religious buildings and structures completed in 1442
Tourist attractions in Burgos
Burial sites of the House of Trastámara